List of awards and nominations received by Naomi Watts is a compilation of the awards which British actress Naomi Watts has won or for which she was nominated. She made her film debut in For Love Alone (1986). However, it was her award-winning role in Mulholland Drive (2001) that first brought her international recognition.  For a complete list of films in which Naomi Watts has appeared, see Naomi Watts filmography.

Major associations

Academy Awards

British Academy Film Awards

Golden Globe Awards

Screen Actors Guild Awards

Other awards and nominations

American Film Institute Awards

Australian Film Institute Awards

Boston Society of Film Critics Awards

Central Ohio Film Critics Association Awards

Chicago Film Critics Association Awards

Cinema Writers Circle Awards

Critics' Choice Awards

Dallas–Fort Worth Film Critics Association Awards

Detroit Film Critics Society Awards

Empire Awards

European Film Awards

Fangoria Chainsaw Awards

Film Critics Circle of Australia Awards

Florida Film Critics Circle Awards

Giffoni Film Festival Awards

Golden Raspberry Awards

Goya Awards

Hollywood Film Festival Awards

Houston Film Critics Society Awards

Independent Spirit Awards

International Cinephile Society Awards

Italian Online Movie Awards

Las Vegas Film Critics Society Awards

London Film Critics' Circle Awards

Los Angeles Film Critics Association Awards

National Association of Theatre Owners Awards

National Board of Review Awards

National Society of Film Critics Awards

New York Film Critics Circle Awards

New York Film Critics Online Awards

Online Film & Television Association Awards

Online Film Critics Society Awards

Outfest Awards

Palm Springs International Film Festival Awards

Phoenix Film Critics Society Awards

San Diego Film Critics Society Awards

Santa Barbara International Film Festival Awards

Satellite Awards

Saturn Awards

Scream Awards

Seattle International Film Festival Awards

Southeastern Film Critics Association Awards

Spike Video Game Awards

St. Louis Gateway Film Critics Association Awards

Teen Choice Awards

Utah Film Critics Association Awards

Vancouver Film Critics Circle Awards

Venice Film Festival Awards

Village Voice Film Poll Awards

Washington D.C. Area Film Critics Association Awards

See also
 Naomi Watts filmography
 Naomi Watts

References

External links

 
 
 

Watts, Naomi